The 2010 European Judo Championships were held at the Ferry-Dusika-Hallenstadion, in Vienna, Austria, from 22 to 25 April 2010.

Medal overview

Men

Women

Medal table

Results overview

Men

–60 kg

–66 kg

–73 kg

–81 kg

–90 kg

–100 kg

+100 kg

Teams

Women

–48 kg

–52 kg

–57 kg

–63 kg

–70 kg

–78 kg

+78 kg

Teams

References

External links
 Official website
 Official website of the European Judo Union
 Results

 
E
2010 in Austrian sport
European Judo Championships
Sports competitions in Vienna
2010s in Vienna
Judo competitions in Austria
International sports competitions hosted by Austria
Judo